Lutfiyar Muslum oglu Imanov (17 April 1928 in Sabirabad – 21 January 2008 in Baku), was a Soviet and Azerbaijani opera singer (dramatic tenor).

Career
Lutfiyar Imanov started his career in the arts as a teenage actor at the Sabirabad State Drama Theatre. He graduated from the Asaf Zeynally Music College with a degree in vocal arts in 1957. At the time, he had been working with various Azerbaijani choirs and orchestras. He made his operatic debut in 1957 when he performed in the leading role in Uzeyir Hajibeyov's opera Koroghlu in Moscow. Upon graduating, he accepted a job at the Azerbaijan State Academic Theatre of Musical Comedy before switching in 1959 to the Azerbaijan State Academic Opera and Ballet Theater where he worked until his death. In 1962, he was admitted to the six-year program in drama studies at the Azerbaijan State University of Culture and Arts. In 1965 and 1975 respectively, Imanov was an intern at the Bolshoi Theatre in Moscow and La Scala in Milan. From 1968 onward, he performed leading roles in over 30 operas.

Besides performing, he taught vocal arts, mostly at the Azerbaijan State Conservatoire, but also in music schools in Istanbul and İzmir, Turkey (1991–95). In the 1990s, he toured Iran, Italy, United Kingdom and Germany. His performance was recognized by him being awarded the prestigious title of the People's Artist of the USSR in 1977.

References

1928 births
2008 deaths
20th-century Azerbaijani male opera singers
21st-century Azerbaijani male opera singers
People from Sabirabad
Azerbaijan State University of Culture and Arts alumni
Honored Artists of the Azerbaijan SSR
People's Artists of Azerbaijan
People's Artists of the USSR
Recipients of the Order of the Red Banner of Labour
Recipients of the Istiglal Order
Recipients of the Shohrat Order
Operatic tenors
Azerbaijani male singers
Azerbaijani music educators
Azerbaijani opera singers
Soviet male opera singers
Soviet music educators
Soviet tenors
Burials at Alley of Honor